The red-tailed pipe snake, red cylinder snake, or common pipe snake (Cylindrophis ruffus) is a nonvenomous cylindrophiid snake species found in Southeast Asia. No subspecies are currently recognized.

Description
Adults can grow to 39 in (1 m) in length.

The dorsal scales are smooth, in 19 or 21 rows, with 186-245 ventrals, which are not quite twice as large as the contiguous dorsal scales; the anal plate is divided, and five to 10 subcaudals.

Compared to other snakes, C. ruffus have a limited gape size. Their primary diet consists of long, thin prey animals including snakes, caecilians, and eels.

Geographic range
It is found in Myanmar and southern China (Fujian, Hong Kong and on Hainan Island), south into Vietnam,  Laos, Cambodia, Thailand, the Malay Peninsula and the East Indies to Indonesia (the Riau Archipelago, Sumatra, Bangka, Borneo, Java, Sulawesi, Buton and the Sula Islands. The type locality given is "Surinami" (possibly a mistake).

References

Cylindrophiidae
Snakes of Southeast Asia
Reptiles of Brunei
Reptiles of Myanmar
Reptiles of Cambodia
Reptiles of China
Fauna of Hong Kong
Reptiles of Indonesia
Reptiles of Laos
Reptiles of Malaysia
Reptiles of Singapore
Reptiles of Thailand
Reptiles of Vietnam
Reptiles described in 1768
Snakes of China
Snakes of Vietnam
Snakes of Asia
Taxa named by Josephus Nicolaus Laurenti
Reptiles of Borneo